His Grace, The Duke of Ankh, Commander Sir Samuel "Sam" Vimes is a fictional character in Terry Pratchett's Discworld series. Vimes is depicted in the novels as somewhere between an Inspector Morse-type 'old-school' British policeman, and a film noir-esque grizzled detective. His appearances throughout the Discworld sequence show him slowly and grudgingly rising through the ranks of both police force and society. As of his latest promotion, his full name and title is stated as being "His Grace, His Excellency, The 1st Duke of Ankh; Commander Sir Samuel Vimes".  When serving as Ambassador for Ankh-Morpork, he is also referred to simply as "His Excellency", and is also nicknamed "Blackboard Monitor Vimes", "Vimes the Butcher/Butcher Vimes" and "Vetinari's Terrier" (or his hammer, depending upon the occasion).  According to his wife, Sybil, Vimes is recognised by many as Lord Vetinari's right-hand man.

He first appeared in the novel Guards! Guards!. While no detailed description of his physical appearance shows up in any of the Discworld novels, Pratchett says in the companion work, The Art of Discworld, that he has always imagined Vimes as a younger, slightly bulkier version of late British actor Pete Postlethwaite. Longtime collaborative artist Paul Kidby, who has worked with Pratchett on several works, portrays him instead as resembling Clint Eastwood.

Vimes is the Commander of the City Watch, the burgeoning police force of the Discworld's largest city, Ankh-Morpork. His rise from drunk policeman to respected member of the aristocracy, and the simultaneous growth and development of the Watch under his command, have together been one of the major threads of the Discworld series. Born into poverty, (as a descendant of disgraced ancient Ankh-Morpork nobility), he became a highly reluctant member of modern Ankh-Morpork nobility, having been made both a knight and a duke, as well as an ambassador. He is married to Sybil Ramkin, the richest woman in the city. They have a son, The Honourable Samuel Vimes II.

Works
Beginning with Guards! Guards! in 1989, the main Discworld books featuring Sam Vimes are:
Guards! Guards! – 1989
Men at Arms – 1993
Feet of Clay – 1996
Jingo – 1997
The Fifth Elephant – 1999
The Truth – 2000 (minor character)
Night Watch – 2002
Monstrous Regiment – 2003 (minor character)
Thud! – 2005
Where's My Cow? – 2005
Making Money – 2007 (minor character)
Unseen Academicals – 2009 (minor character)
Snuff – 2011
Raising Steam – 2013 (supporting character)

Background
Sam Vimes was born in Cockbill Street as the son of Thomas Vimes, (son of Gwilliam Vimes) in the Rimwards part of the Shades, the poorest area of Ankh-Morpork. It is depicted as being so poor that there was little crime, though Sam was part of a street gang (The Cockbill Street Roaring Lads) with Lupine Wonse (who later became secretary to Lord Vetinari).

Vimes was educated at a dame school, where he was once blackboard monitor for a whole term, before he had to drop out and concentrate on learning about life out on the streets.  It is mentioned in Jingo that Sam Vimes' father, Thomas Vimes, had been a watchman prior to his death.  His mother would go on to tell young Sam that his father was 'run down by a cart when he was crossing the street'. He privately reckons later that his father was a drunk: "Vimes had never known his father.  His mum told him that the man had been run over by a cart, but Vimes suspected that if this were true at all, then it was probably a brewer's cart, which had 'run him over' a bit at a time for years". Whatever happened to him exactly, she raised the young Sam on her own. She died about twenty years after the events of Night Watch, or about ten years prior to the "present-day" events in that novel (before Vimes' first appearance in Guards! Guards!), and is buried in the city's Small Gods Cemetery. In Night Watch Sam remembers that his mother made 'the very best' Distressed Pudding.

The Vimes family is mentioned as historically being closely linked with the City Watch, with many members serving in it through its history. It has been suggested that Sam's father was a watchman in Jingo and he is a descendant of Suffer-Not-Injustice "Old Stoneface" Vimes, the Watch Commander who instigated the rebellion against, and subsequently beheaded, Lorenzo the Kind, the last king of the city, a sadistic torturer described as "very fond of children." As a consequence, the Vimes family was stripped of its nobility. For three centuries afterwards, the memory of "Old Stoneface" has lived on in infamy and, as his descendant, Vimes has frequently endured suspicious mutterings from the aristocracy. Vimes is implied to heavily resemble his ancestor and they share a nickname: Old Stoneface. The Annotated Pratchett File notes that Suffer-Not-Injustice Vimes is closely modelled on Oliver Cromwell, and that the name of his supporters, the Ironheads, is a portmanteau of Ironsides and Roundheads, Cromwell's regiment and faction, respectively.

Vimes was sixteen when he joined the Watch. He was part of that section of the Watch which played a large role in the rebellion against Homicidal Lord Winder. It was around this time he was taught all he knew by Sergeant-At-Arms John Keel, which is where his cynical outlook on life and his firm belief in justice comes from.
In the newest stories, Keel is Vimes himself transported back in time by thirty years. As Lu-Tze explains to Vimes in Night Watch, both pasts are true and there was a real John Keel. Vimes was transported back in time in the company of a criminal named Carcer, whom he was trying to apprehend. Carcer robbed and killed the real John Keel, and Vimes had to replace him in order for his role in history to be fulfilled.

Vimes' age is never explicitly given, and information is not always consistent. Night Watch states that Vimes was sixteen years old when he joined the City Watch. It is mentioned in Men at Arms that Vimes has been in the Watch for 25 years, making him 41 at the time of that novel. The main events of Night Watch, set only a few weeks after Vimes joined the Watch, are stated as occurring more than thirty years prior to the present from which Vimes came, this makes Samuel Vimes at least 46 years old at the time of the events of that book. Thud! gives the age of Vimes' son, (also named Sam), born during the climax of Night Watch, as being fourteen months, which would put Vimes at a minimum of 47 or 48 years old during the events of the book. When Vimes discusses his time as a blackboard monitor, he thinks about it being "more than 45 years ago" and that he was six years old at the time, putting his age at least 51 years; this is confirmed when he refers to the new vampire officer, age given as 51, as being "not that much younger than him". It is also mentioned in Night Watch, that at the time of the "Glorious Revolution of the Twenty-Fifth of May", both Sam Vimes and Havelock Vetinari were 16 years old, meaning that they are both the same age.

The Watch
During the first 25 years of his term in the Watch, Vimes rose to Captain of the Night Watch, a position that he attained about ten years prior to the events of Guards! Guards!, as it dwindled to a tiny stub – while the power of the Thieves' Guild grew. This insult to Vimes' sense of justice, together with his being naturally knurd (the opposite of being drunk, where one is stripped of all the illusions that make life bearable) and other events (it has been claimed he was "brung low by a woman", which is an interpretation of the anthropomorphisation of the city, Morporkia), led towards heavy drinking. At this time, he lived in near poverty, giving away almost all of his salary to widows and orphans of watchmen, and spending what was left on alcohol and cheap boots.

All that changed when Carrot Ironfoundersson came to the city. A human raised by dwarfs, Carrot joined the Watch and set out to help the city. Around the same time, a dragon assaulted the city, and the Watch was instrumental in its defeat. The whole series of events forced Vimes to sober-up long enough to uncover who was responsible for summoning the Dragon, after which the changes in his personal life led to him coming off of the drink and switching to smoking cigars, and occasionally, taking snuff.

Vimes, who was about to retire following his marriage to Lady Sybil, was given the resurrected rank of Commander, putting him in charge of the Night Watch and the Day Watch. He also received a knighthood.

The Watch was given a new headquarters, Pseudopolis Yard (an allusion to the name of the headquarters of London's Metropolitan Police: Scotland Yard), by Lady Sybil Ramkin (Vimes's soon-to-be wife) after the dragon destroyed their original base at Treacle Mine Road. It had been her childhood home, and in Thud! it is revealed that some of her family's possessions are still stored in the attic of the building – in this instance they retrieved a copy of Methodia Rascal's Koom Valley painting, made by Sybil as a child, after the original is stolen.

As part of an equal-opportunities drive required by the Patrician, the Watch under Vimes eventually took on extra staff in the form of a werewolf, a dwarf and a troll (and later a gargoyle, a gnome, a golem, an Igor, a zombie, and a vampire). They were instrumental in foiling an attempt on the Patrician's life, and were rewarded. The Watch was rapidly revived and became increasingly important in the city.

Vimes took a great interest in the restructuring of the Watch, placing new Watch Houses where they were needed and supervising the creation of both a Watch Academy and a forensics section. His reform of the City Watch has been so successful that by Night Watch, Vimes-trained policemen are in high demand in cities across the Disc. They are known as Sammies (which is based on the British terms for police officers, Bobbies, and the now obsolete Peelers both after Robert Peel and possibly on the earlier term "Charleys" for night watchmen, after Charles II during whose reign they were instituted), even to the people who may have never actually heard of Samuel Vimes himself. In his expanding international and diplomatic role, Vimes appreciates the fact that police officers from Sto Lat to Genua have been trained to salute him, and remain in unofficial contact across the Disc.

Character
Vimes is a very conflicted character. An incorruptible idealist with deep beliefs in justice and an abiding love of his city, he is also a committed cynic whose knowledge of human nature constantly reminds him how far off those ideals are. Having married into the upper classes, he still possesses an innate dislike of inherited wealth and an instinctive revulsion towards social inequality. The Patrician observes that Vimes is anti-authoritarian even though he is, himself, an authority figure, which is "practically Zen". The conflict within Vimes is between his virtuous nature ("the Watchman") and what he calls "the Beast". In The Art of Discworld, Pratchett explains that Vimes protects himself from the Beast with the symbol of his own badge, which prevents him from becoming the criminal he despises, at least in his own mind. Although in Guards! Guards! Vimes is all but shocked at Vetinari's disturbingly cynical (and probably disturbingly accurate) view of the world, he in turn has been called "the most cynical bastard that ever walked under the sun" (in I Shall Wear Midnight). Although widely differing characters, Vimes and Vetinari can be called similar in that they both have very cynical worldviews, but fairly idealistic aims.

Vimes has once been described as a speciesist, though this habit slowly dies away; most of his officers rationalize this bias as simply not being particularly fond of anyone. However, he will warm up to anyone he considers a "good copper" regardless of their unusual background and has allowed the Watch to become one of the most species-blind employers in the city. Initially, Vimes is jokingly described as only fond of rural dwarfs and wizards, the former who only commit crimes underground and away from him and the latter ironically sharing his respectful distaste for using magic irresponsibly. A notable exception is his explicit dislike of vampires. He explained to Lady Margolotta in The Fifth Elephant, this is because, teetotal or not, 'a vampire will always seek to dominate a human being'.

Despite being viewed by many of the Discworld's more Machiavellian power brokers as easy to fool, Vimes is more cunning than he appears. His years of practical experience give him a foundation of hard-headed realism on which he bases much of his more idealistic beliefs. A running gag in the series is his thwarting of several attempts on his life by the Assassins' Guild, due to his knowledge of their rigid code of conduct. Thanks to the funds now available to him, through marriage, his mansion is set with numerous traps, so that the Assassins, who must always offer a sporting chance, cannot get close to him without suffering a severe mishap. Traps include roof tiles set on greased rails, sawn roof joists over the dragon pens and bear traps in the shrubbery. Vimes also personally makes sure that all of the brickwork is kept in good repair, with no convenient handholds.  In addition, Vimes' office at Pseudopolis Yard has "everything that his ingenuity could devise", including sharp ornamental railings, "which are pretty, and make the house look nice, but are, above all, spiky."

Whenever he thwarts an Assassin in an attempt, he usually lets them go after taking their share of the payment for his inhumation (which he then donates to the 'Watch Widows and Orphans Fund', or to the 'Sunshine Sanctuary for Sick, Abused or Abandoned Dragons'), and subjecting them to a little humiliation. Though he finds it to be annoying, Vimes takes these continued attempts on his life as a sign that he's angering somebody, and so must be doing something right. In every book in the series, the fee for his assassination has risen until he has been removed from the Guild register, meaning that contracts on his life are no longer accepted (this was initially literal, as no assassin wanted to take the contract). Vimes was made aware of this by a young female student from the guild, who had been tasked with merely getting a glimpse of Vimes at his home (after she had fallen into one of the "eventually lethal" traps). Vimes is considering appealing the decision. In The Fifth Elephant, Vimes managed to evade, fight off, and 'kill' part of a pack of werewolves in "the game", a werewolf tradition of chasing a human back to civilization that humans did not often win. (Angua's brother Wolfgang denies that the werewolves died, as they can only truly be killed by silver; they would just have "nasty headaches later on.") Vimes also reflects on killing a werewolf in Night Watch and Vetinari mentions him killing a werewolf in Thud!. He eventually did actually kill Wolfgang (with a firework, it having been previously established that werewolves can be killed by fire as well as silver.)

While not otherwise well-traveled, in the days of Guards! Guards! he could tell exactly where he was anywhere within the city limits of Ankh-Morpork just by the feel of the cobbles beneath his feet, due to the thinness of his boots at the time, having walked the streets of the city for thirty years and a knowledge of the difference of the cobbles therein. When he is returned to the past in Night Watch, he uses this ability to locate a group of monks he needs in order to return to his present. Later in the series, the expensive, good quality boots his wife persists in buying for him restrict this ability.

Vimes' firm grasp of basic human nature, and of the Ankh-Morpork psyche in particular, led to him spending some years as a drunk, and Fred Colon postulates that this was because Vimes' body didn't produce any "natural alcohol", and he estimates that Vimes was about "two drinks below par". This meant that when he hadn't been drinking, he was beyond sober - he was "knurd". Thus he saw reality as it really was ("first sight"); stripped of all the mental illusions that most people construct in their minds to get to sleep at night ("second sight"). This horrifying state of mind caused Vimes to try to balance it out through drinking, but he would get the dosage wrong and would just end up drunk. Vimes gave up alcohol after his marriage to Sybil, and now smokes foul-smelling cigars instead. He still keeps an unopened bottle of 'Bearhugger's Whisky' in his bottom desk drawer as a 'permanent test'.

Terry Pratchett noted the following about Vimes on Usenet: "Vimes is fundamentally a person. He fears he may be a bad person because he knows what he thinks rather than just what he says and does. He chokes off all of those little reactions and impulses, but he knows what they are. So he tries to act like a good person, often in situations where the map is unclear." This, along with the Discworld habit of pushing any theory as hard as it goes, appears to have culminated in Vimes' psyche creating its own 'internal policeman' to "Guard the Guardsmen", (cf. Quis custodiet ipsos custodes?), and Vimes' own sense of justice being so strong that, in Thud!, it was even able to fend off the attempts to possess him by a 'quasi-demonic thing of pure vengeance'.

It has also been noted that, in personality and mental setup, Vimes bears some similarity to Granny Weatherwax. Both are effectively 'good' characters, who nevertheless both secretly fear the darkness inside themselves, and constantly strive to control the darker sides of their nature.

Vimes often has to go to report to Lord Vetinari, although most of the time he keeps a poker-face and answers very simply to avoid Vetinari's probing questions. When given bad news, he has a tendency to, on his way out, pound his fist against a certain spot of wall near the office door. Though he sometimes has to call in a plasterer when Vimes is particularly angry, Vetinari doesn't worry about it—a sign that he intentionally angers Vimes so as to goad him into a desired action. When Vimes was temporarily relieved of command in Men at Arms, the fact that Vimes didn't pound the wall led Vetinari to realize that he 'may have gone too far'.

Sometimes this darker side comes out when Vimes loses control of his anger and he effectively 'goes spare'. In Men at Arms, he temporarily gains possession of the Gonne, a malevolent firearm which drives him to violence, but he restrains the urge to "make things right", enough to eventually let it go without seriously hurting anyone. In Feet of Clay, Corporal Nobby Nobbs refuses the position of King of Ankh-Morpork, primarily due to the fear of incurring Vimes's general wrath and hatred of royalty.

In Thud!, after an attempted assassination of his family, Vimes becomes furious at the 'deep-down dwarves', a problem only made worse by the presence of a dark entity of pure vengeance within his mind. Both of those factors, and a near-Death experience that forced him to miss his 6:00pm story-time with his son, culminate in him snapping and temporarily losing over to "the Beast", going insane/berserk and single-handedly storming the deep-downers responsible, all the while roaring out the lines to Where's My Cow?; ("...IS THAT MY COW? IT GOES, 'MOOOOO!'...") with such ferocity and madness that their personal guard come to the conclusion that "they had sworn to fight to the death, but not to this death," and run away. As he is about to massacre the now-defenceless deep-downers, he hesitates thanks to "the Watchman" in his head and begins to struggle with himself, which buys enough time for Sergeant Angua to arrive at the scene and force him down. He never completely loses control, and always manages to restrain himself (or have someone around to restrain him) in the end.

Revealed in the events of Thud!, after years of night-time patrols, Vimes' mindscape is described as the city of Ankh-Morpork-itself, streets and all, in the dead of night, whilst the rains are bucketing down over your head. Whenever Vimes is angry, doors of some of the houses open (the more angry he is, the more numbers of doors will open). While the Summoning Dark had trespassed into his mind, needing a host in order to track down the Deep-Downer Dwarves, would try to enter through one of the doors that opened when Vimes became angry, only to be pulled away at every time. It is later revealed that the force that was preventing the Summoning Dark from making any progress in possessing Vimes was Vimes' own 'inner guardsman', who patrols the streets of his mind.

Vimes is an effective and brutal hand-to-hand fighter, who specialises in "dirty fighting". He also prefers non-lethal takedowns whenever possible.

During heightened states of mind, such as when confronting his darker side and/or when near death, he is able to see Death, (this happened in The Fifth Elephant and Thud!, although he was unable to do this in Night Watch). Death himself is unsure whether Vimes should die or not in these cases, citing "quantum" as an explanation.  At one point Death notes that if Vimes is having a 'near-Death' experience, Death is also forced to have a 'near Vimes' experience (as of Thud! Death has started bringing books to read during these occasions).

On rare occasions, Sam Vimes has been described as completely happy, even if it's only for a brief period; such occasions include alone time with his wife, the birth of his son, and whenever a case has reached a satisfactory conclusion. At the end of the events of Snuff, Vimes was also genuinely amazed to learn that a new book, "Pride and Extreme Prejudice", had been dedicated to him.

Lady Sybil
Lady Sybil Vimes (full title: Her Grace, The Duchess of Ankh, Lady Sybil Deidre Olgivanna Vimes (née Ramkin)), is Vimes's wife, whom he married at the end of Men at Arms. First introduced in Guards! Guards!, she is a rather imposing Wagnerian aristocrat, but also a kind-hearted and compassionate person, embodying the positive aspects of aristocrats, who are otherwise depicted unflatteringly in Ankh-Morpork's population. She is a deeply gracious lady, able to like almost anyone (even Nobby Nobbs). She donated a property, Pseudopolis Yard, (bought by her father), to the Watch after their original headquarters was burnt by a dragon.

She was born into the wealthiest family in Ankh-Morpork and resides in the most select part of Ankh, Scoone Avenue. As well as being an amateur soprano, she is a leading expert in swamp dragons and has a dragon pen outside her house where she breeds and cares for swamp dragons, though aside from her hobby most of her house is vaguely under-tended due to apparent lack of interest. She also supports The Sunshine Sanctuary For Sick, Abused Or Abandoned Swamp Dragons, which is run by her friend Rosie Devant-Molei. Her hobby has left her with her natural hair singed off and she wears a wig in nearly all circumstances. Despite her high-class upbringing, she has displayed a resourcefulness ("in an outdoorsy kind of way") that first attracted Vimes's attention. 
 
The pattern of Sam and Sybil's marriage was set the moment he turned away from his wedding to chase an assassin who had just made an attempt on the Patrician's life. Lady Sybil is a remarkably patient woman; she spent nearly the entirety of The Fifth Elephant attempting to inform her increasingly distracted husband that she was pregnant with their first child. Though he finds being affectionate in public embarrassing and is divided on disliking Sybil's status as a noble, it is clear that Vimes loves his wife dearly; indeed when he was trapped in the past alone in a world he no longer recognised, the History Monks gave him a silver cigar case his wife had bought him to inspire him to continue with his mission. It is unclear if his hatred of crime and the evil of humanity is greater than his love for his wife. Sybil bears this divided loyalty with some grace; nearly every Watch novel concludes with Sam making some form of amends to his neglected wife, either a delayed honeymoon, or simply time alone with their new baby.

In spite (or perhaps because) of her wealth, Sybil engages in certain 'housewife'-like activities such as repairing socks and preparing meals. This is mainly out of a sense of duty and tradition than actual need or skill. Sam is somewhat baffled by the overtures, but as he is already used to an imperfect lifestyle, he is generally appreciative of the sentiment.

Sybil maintains a number of close (female) social contacts from her schooldays, who, thanks to the kind of school she went to (The Quirm College for Young Ladies), are now all strategically placed in the highest levels of power across the Sto Plains and often more powerful than Ankh-Morpork Guild leaders. Vimes once conjectured that if they so conspired, they could run the world, if they don't already do so.

Sybil tries her utmost to get Sam to take some time off in almost every book, but for the most part, Sam finds an excuse to stay on the job. In Snuff, Sybil forces Vimes to take a vacation to their countryside estate, Crundells. The character of one of her ancestors, John "Mad Jack" Ramkin, was inspired from real-life aristocrat John "Mad Jack" Fuller of Sussex (&/or John "Mad Jack" Mytton of Shropshire).  As the aforementioned John "Mad Jack" Ramkin is also hailed as the 3rd Earl Ramkin, this reveals that the Ramkin estate is an earldom, and that Lady Sybil was already a countess (provided that the title wasn't entailed) before her husband, Sam Vimes', elevation to Duke at the end of Jingo.

Vimes as Duke of Ankh
Vimes' involvement in preventing a pointless war with Klatch in the novel Jingo led to his being once more rewarded with an unwanted title, in this case, Duke of Ankh. He now finds himself in the awkward position ("practically zen" according to his boss) of continuing to despise the ruling classes of the city while actually being a member of them. In the course of his mission to Überwald as ambassador, he was disgusted to learn that he was also entitled to be addressed as "His Excellency", although he learns to wield it for practical clout, especially when perusing investigations where his status as an officer is unknown or ignored.

His role as Duke of Ankh largely involves diplomacy (his visit to Überwald in The Fifth Elephant for example), and his rough and ready upbringing has given him an obliquely effective approach to this field. For instance, he once threatened to personally send an opposing diplomat "home in an ambulance" for parading his troops near Ankh-Morpork borders, an act that caused the man to order an immediate withdrawal so drastic that Havelock Vetinari remarked "they were nearly in the next country over." Despite having competent subordinates, including Captains Carrot and Angua and Sergeant Detritus, Vimes finds it difficult to delegate, and is frustrated by the fact that the growth of the Watch has left him with less and less time for actual boots-on-the-pavement policing. In some ways he found it a relief when, in Night Watch, he was transported back to the Ankh-Morpork of his youth, and became a sergeant-at-arms in the inefficient, paperwork-free albeit moderately corrupt Watch of that time.

Young Sam
Young Sam (full title: The Hon. Samuel "Young Sam" Vimes II) is Sam and Sybil Vimes' son and only child; he was born at the end of the events in Night Watch, is about fourteen months old by the time of Thud!, and at the age of six years by the time of the events of Snuff. His birth was difficult, and Vimes paid Doctor "Mossy" Lawn a large sum of money in gratitude for saving Sybil's and the baby's lives. Lawn has since founded the Lady Sybil Free Hospital.

Since his son's birth, Vimes discovered a new cause in life: "arriving at home every day at six o' clock sharp to read Where's My Cow? to him, an obligation that supersedes crime, conspiracy or international negotiations—his thinking being that if he ever missed it for a good reason, he might miss it for a bad reason, and that this might apply to everything he does, such as employing less-than-ethical methods in the pursuit of crime".

In Snuff, it is highlighted that not only can Young Sam read, but that he is quite advanced and now reads to his father. It is also shown that he is currently quite stuck on the study of poo, having read many books written by one Miss Felicity Beedle, whom he knows as "the poo lady", and who has also written such books as Where's My Cow?, The World of Poo, Melvin and the Enormous Boil, Geoffrey and the Magic Pillow Case and The Little Duckling Who Thought He Was an Elephant.

Recent developments
Vimes is, much to his own horror, becoming a politician. He remains in his soul a copper. Being a significant figure on the world stage just means he finds bigger crimes.

Vimes has seen involvement with 
 William de Worde, Otto Chriek and The Ankh-Morpork Times in The Truth
 The war between Borogravia and Zlobenia (and everyone else in the region) in Monstrous Regiment
 Moist von Lipwig in his running of the Post Office and the Grand Trunk Company's monopoly on the "clacks" system in Going Postal and fraud involving the Royal Bank of Ankh-Morpork in Making Money
 Ethnic tensions between dwarfs and trolls in Thud!
 Ethnic tensions between humans and goblins in Snuff
 Tensions between dwarf factions over the Clacks and the new railway in Raising Steam

Terry Pratchett commented that the Vimes character made setting a story in Ankh-Morpork very difficult as it is almost impossible to create a story involving any sort of crime or politics without it rapidly becoming a Watch book.

Bibliography
Sam Vimes is the central character in Guards! Guards!, Men at Arms, Feet of Clay, Jingo, The Fifth Elephant, Night Watch, Thud! and Snuff. He is a secondary character in The Truth and Monstrous Regiment and has cameos in The Last Hero, Going Postal, Making Money, Unseen Academicals, I Shall Wear Midnight and Raising Steam. He has also appeared in the City Watch Diary and the picture book Where's My Cow?. He is also mentioned, although not by name, in The Amazing Maurice and His Educated Rodents.

Other media
Vimes is played by Richard Dormer in the live-action television series The Watch, "inspired by Terry Pratchett's 'Discworld' novels", rather than being a straight adaptation of specific stories.

Guards! Guards! was adapted for BBC Radio 5 in 1992 and starred  John Wood as Vimes. Night Watch was adapted for BBC Radio 4 in 2007, with actor Philip Jackson as Vimes.

While there have been a number of amateur stage productions of the books, a professional adaptation of Guards! Guards! went on tour in 1998. Vimes was played by Paul Darrow, best known for his role in Blake's 7.

Vimes also appeared in the game Discworld Noir.

Reception and legacy
Discussing Pratchett's legacy in The Guardian, Andrew Brown wrote that Vimes "may be the most fully realised decent man in modern literature," while the Hollywood Reporter has described him as "Inspector Morse-meets-Humphrey Bogart-esque".

The Cretaceous conifer species Pseudotorellia vimesiana is named after Sam Vimes.

In episode 3.4 "Coda" of the TV series Endeavour, Inspector Fred Thursday states that his old mentor was "Sergeant Vimes, Cable Street".

In 2022, the Terry Pratchett Estate authorized Jack Monroe to use the "Vimes Boots Index" as the name of a price index she devised to document inflation in prices of basic necessities. The name comes from a passage in Men at Arms in which Vimes muses on the expensive nature of poverty. As of 20 July 2022, this index does not exist.

See also
 Ankh-Morpork City Watch members

References

External links
 Samuel Vimes article in Discworld & Pratchett Wiki
 Samuel Vimes reading order

Discworld characters
Literary characters introduced in 1989
Fictional dukes and duchesses
Fictional police officers
Fictional police captains
Fictional commanders
Fictional ambassadors
Fictional diplomats
Fictional revolutionaries
Fictional alcohol abusers
Male characters in literature